Miracles Still Happen is a 1951 West German romantic comedy film directed by Willi Forst and starring Forst, Hildegard Knef and Marianne Wischmann. It was intended by Forst as a more harmless follow-up to his controversial The Sinner which had also starred Knef. It was shot at the Bendestorf Studios and on location in Hamburg, Bavaria and Austria. The film's sets were designed by the art director Franz Schroedter and Karl Weber.

Cast

References

Bibliography

External links 
 

1951 films
1951 romantic comedy films
German romantic comedy films
West German films
1950s German-language films
Films directed by Willi Forst
German black-and-white films
1950s German films